Kari Mette Johansen (born 11 January 1979) is a Norwegian team handball player, a two time Olympic champion, once a world champion and four times European champion. She was voted into the All star team at the 2006 European Women's Handball Championship, where she won gold medal with the Norwegian national team.

Career
Born in Fredrikstad, Kari Mette Johansen played for the Norwegian club Larvik HK. She made her debut on the national team in 2004, where she played 203 matches and scored 493 goals. She is now retired.

She won Olympic gold medals in 2008 and 2012.

References

External links

1979 births
Living people
Norwegian female handball players
Handball players at the 2008 Summer Olympics
Olympic handball players of Norway
Olympic gold medalists for Norway
Olympic medalists in handball
Handball players at the 2012 Summer Olympics
Medalists at the 2012 Summer Olympics
Medalists at the 2008 Summer Olympics
Sportspeople from Fredrikstad
21st-century Norwegian women